Douglas Reynolds VC (20 September 1882 – 23 February 1916) was an English recipient of the Victoria Cross, the highest and most prestigious award for gallantry in the face of the enemy that can be awarded to British and Commonwealth forces.

The son of Lt.-Col. Henry Charles Reynolds and Sarah Eleanor B. Goodwyn, he was educated at Cheltenham College. He was 31 years old, and a captain in the 37th Bty., Royal Field Artillery, British Army during the First World War when the following deed took place for which he was awarded the VC.

On 26 August 1914 at Le Cateau, France, Captain Reynolds took up two teams with volunteer drivers, to recapture two British guns and limbered up two guns under heavy artillery and infantry fire. Although the enemy was within 100 yards he managed, with the help of two drivers (Job Henry Charles Drain and Frederick Luke), to get one gun away safely. On 9 September at Pysloup, he reconnoitered at close range, discovered a battery which was holding up the advance and silenced it.

He was awarded the French Croix de Chevalier de Legion d’Honneur on 3 November 1914, and his Victoria Cross was presented to him by King George V at Buckingham Palace on 13 January 1915.

Reynolds later achieved the rank of major, but was wounded in action by a gas shell, and died in the Duchess of Westminster's hospital in Le Touquet, France, on 23 February 1916.

Major Reynolds is buried in Etaples Military Cemetery in Northern France, while his Victoria Cross is displayed at the Royal Artillery Museum in Woolwich, London.

Freemasonry
He was Initiated into English Freemasonry in Kitchener Lodge, No. 2998, (New Delhi, India) on 12 June; Passed on 5 August and Raised on 2 December 1912.

References

Monuments to Courage (David Harvey, 1999)
The Register of the Victoria Cross (This England, 1997)
VCs of the First World War - 1914 (Gerald Gliddon, 1994)

External links
 Douglas REYNOLDS of Cheltenham College
 

1882 births
1916 deaths
Military personnel from Bristol
People educated at Cheltenham College
Royal Field Artillery officers
British Army personnel of World War I
British World War I recipients of the Victoria Cross
British military personnel killed in World War I
British Army recipients of the Victoria Cross
Burials at Étaples Military Cemetery